Al-Auja is a Palestinian town in the Jericho Governorate in the eastern West Bank, located ten kilometers north of Jericho. The town has a total area of 107,905 dunams, however its built-up area comprises only 832 dunams.  It is situated 230 meters below sea level.

Agricultural land makes up over 10% of the town's area, mostly planted with bananas, oranges, and vegetables for which al-Auja is well known. Irrigation water is mainly supplied from the al-Auja spring.

History

The town is built along, and shares the name of, the Wadi al-Auja stream, "al-auja" meaning "the meandering one". This should not to be confused with the other river called in Arabic by the same name, Nahr al-Auja, and known by its biblical and Hebrew name as the Yarkon River. During World War I this coincidence led to the term of "the line of the two Aujas" referring to a strategic line connecting the two river valleys.

British Mandate era
In the 1922 census of Palestine conducted by the British Mandate authorities, Al-Auja, together with  ad-Duyuk and Nweimeh had a population of 332; 322 Muslims and 10 Christians, where the Christians were 7 Orthodox, and 3 Syrian Catholic. According to the 1931 census, Al-Auja had a population of 253 Muslims, in 100 houses.

In the 1945 statistics, the village's population was 290, while Arab el Nuseirat had 520, Arab el Kaabina had 260, Arab el Ureinat had 210 and Arab el Saayida had 110 members; a total of 1,390; all Muslims, and together they  had jurisdiction over 106,946 dunams of land. Of this, 418 dunams were used for citrus and bananas, 2,822 dunams were for plantations and irrigable land, 6,502 for cereals, while a total of 97,204  dunams were classified as non-cultivable areas.

Jordanian era
In the wake of the 1948 Arab–Israeli War, and after the 1949 Armistice Agreements, al-Auja came under Jordanian rule. It was annexed by Jordan in 1950.

Post 1967
Since the 1967 Six-Day War, al-Auja has been under Israeli occupation. 30,147 dunams of al-Auja's land was classified as "closed-off area" barred from Palestinian use.

According to ARIJ, Israel have  confiscated land from Al-Auja in order to construct four Israeli settlements:
993 dunams for Nativ HaGdud,
499 dunams for Yitav.
497 dunams for Niran,
268 dunams for Gilgal.

According to the Palestinian Central Bureau of Statistics, al-Auja had a population of over 4,000 inhabitants in mid-year 2006. In 1997, refugees constituted 24.7% of the population. The 15.5% of Al-Auja area which is located in "Area A", was transferred to the Palestinian National Authority in a 1994 deal which also included Jericho and Gaza. The remaining 84.5% of al-Auja is Area C, which remains under total Israeli control.

Archaeology

Archelais
Archelais, a Herodian town founded by and named after Herod Archelaus, is now an archaeological site on the northern outskirts of Auja (Khirbet el-Beiyudat), and is gradually being covered by modern Palestinian construction and devastated by treasure hunters.

References

Bibliography

External links
Welcome To al-'Auja
Survey of Western Palestine, Map 15: IAA, Wikimedia commons
Al 'Auja Town (Fact Sheet), Applied Research Institute–Jerusalem (ARIJ)
Al 'Auja Town Profile (ARIJ)
Al 'Auja aerial photo (ARIJ)
Locality Development Priorities and Needs in Al 'Auja (ARIJ)

Towns in the West Bank
Municipalities of the State of Palestine